James Charles Walsh (September 22, 1885 – July 3, 1962) was an Irish professional baseball outfielder. He played in Major League Baseball (MLB) from 1912 through 1917 for the Philadelphia Athletics (1912–13, 1914–16), New York Yankees (1914) and Boston Red Sox (1916–17). Walsh batted left-handed and threw right-handed. He was born in Kallila, Ireland.  He was the only player on the 1913 World Champion Athletics who was not born in the United States.

Achievements 
Walsh played in over 1,800 games spanning 13 seasons in the International League, hitting better than .300 ten times. He played for the Baltimore Orioles from 1910 to 1912, then spent the rest of the decade in the American League, appearing in two World Series with the Athletics in 1914 and for the World Champion Red Sox in 1916.

In a six-season career, Walsh was a .232 hitter (410-for-1771) with six home runs and 150 RBI in 541 games, including 235 runs, 71 doubles, 31 triples, 92 stolen bases, and a .330 on-base percentage. In 492 appearances at center field (169), right field (165) and left field (162), he posted a collective .964 fielding percentage (38 errors in 1049 total chances).

Following his major league career, Walsh returned to the International League, playing on two pennant winners in Baltimore. Twice he led the league with a .357 average in 1925 and a .388 average in 1926 at the age of 41, also driving in 131 runs.
 
Walsh died in Syracuse, New York at age 76.

See also 
 List of players from Ireland in Major League Baseball

References

External links

 Retrosheet
 

Boston Red Sox players
New York Yankees players
Philadelphia Athletics players
Major League Baseball outfielders
Major League Baseball players from Ireland
Irish baseball players
Irish emigrants to the United States (before 1923)
Minor league baseball managers
Syracuse Stars (minor league baseball) players
Albany Senators players
Northampton Meadowlarks players
Baltimore Orioles (IL) players
Seattle Rainiers players
Akron Buckeyes players
Newark Bears (IL) players
Jersey City Skeeters players
Buffalo Bisons (minor league) players
Toronto Maple Leafs (International League) players
Indianapolis Indians players
Hartford Senators players
Fairmont Black Diamonds players
1885 births
1962 deaths
Sportspeople from County Mayo